Jean-Michel Couve (born 3 January 1940) is a French cardiologist and politician who represented the 4th constituency of the Var department in the National Assembly from 1988 to 2017. He previously held a seat at-large following the 1986 legislative election, the first to introduce proportional representation in Parliament under the Fifth Republic. A member of The Republicans (LR), which he joined upon the party's establishment in 2015, Couve had previously been a member of its predecessor parties, the Rally for the Republic (RPR) and Union for a Popular Movement (UMP).

A native of Le Muy, Var, Couve also served in the Departmental Council of Var for the canton of Saint-Tropez from 1992 to 2001 and as Mayor of Saint-Tropez twice, from 1983 to 1989 and again from 1993 until 2008. He did not run for reelection to Parliament in 2017 but remained from 2014 to 2020 a member of the municipal council of Saint-Tropez, to which he was first elected in 1977.

References

1940 births
Living people
French cardiologists
People from Var (department)
Politicians from Provence-Alpes-Côte d'Azur
Departmental councillors (France)
French city councillors
Mayors of places in Provence-Alpes-Côte d'Azur
Rally for the Republic politicians
Union for a Popular Movement politicians
The Republicans (France) politicians
Deputies of the 12th National Assembly of the French Fifth Republic
Deputies of the 13th National Assembly of the French Fifth Republic
Deputies of the 14th National Assembly of the French Fifth Republic